Samuel Wakefield Canan (June 7, 1898 – March 1964) was a United States Navy officer, and governor of American Samoa. Canan was born on June 7, 1898 in Altoona, Pennsylvania. He was admitted to the United States Naval Academy on June 24, 1916 out of Pennsylvania. He succeeded Ralph Hungerford as governor in 1945, filling the position for only eight days, from September 3, 1945 to September 10, 1945.

References

1898 births
1964 deaths
Governors of American Samoa
United States Naval Academy alumni
People from Altoona, Pennsylvania
Military personnel from Pennsylvania
United States Navy personnel of World War II